Henri-Marie Dondra (14 August 1966) is a politician from the Central African Republic. He was the Prime Minister of the Central African Republic, having been in office since 15 June 2021 until 7 February 2022. He had previously served as Minister of Finance and Budget before becoming prime minister, specifically from 2016 to 2021.

References 

Living people
1966 births
Finance ministers of the Central African Republic
Prime Ministers of the Central African Republic
Government ministers of the Central African Republic
Central African Republic politicians